Khengarji I (1510-1585) was an Indian ruler belonging to Jadeja clan of Rajputs. He was the ruler of Morbi from 1538-1585 and later became ruler of Cutch, assuming title of Rao of Cutch, ruling unified Cutch from 1548 to 1585.

Early life
Khengarji I was son of Jam Hamirji of Lakhiarviro (Cutch), chief of one of branch of Jadeja and descendant of Othaji.  It is believed that Jam Rawal attributed the murder of his father Jam Lakhaji to Hamirji, as he was killed within the territory of Lakhiarviro, where he had been invited on the pretense of resolving  the dispute between the two branches. Jam Rawal, in revenge, treacherously killed his uncle Rao Hamirji in 1524 and ruled Cutch for more than two decades.

In court of Mahmud Begada
At the time of murder of Hamirji, his elder sons, Alioji and Khengarji both were in Ahmadabad and escaped the complete destruction of the royal family of senior branch. Further, the other two sons of Hamirji were saved from execution by the wife of Jam Rawal. Khengarji was 15 years old when his father was murdered. He enlisted himself in to the army of Mahmud Begada and became his confidante. During one royal hunting party, Khengarji I killed a lion and saved the life of Sultan Begada for which he was asked to name his reward.

Ruler of Morbi
The prime ambition of Khengarji was to regain Cutch and hence he asked for support to fight Jam Rawal, whereby, he was given 1000 soldiers and fiefdom of Morvi and given a title of Rao by the Sultan Mohamad Beghda in 1538.

Conquering of Cutch
Rao Khengar now based at Morbi, with the support of army provided to him and well wishers within Cutch fought with Jam Rawal and slowly started gaining the territories of Rapar and nearby villages. As Khengarji was the rightful heir to the throne he was welcomed within Cutch.

On other hand, Jam Rawal, was finding himself squeezed in terms of manpower. He was ardent devotee of Ashapura the Kuldevi of Jadejas and folklore are that the Goddess indicated  in a dream to Jam Rawal to leave Kutch and establish himself at Halar region and that she will support him in this venture. Jam Rawal, later escaped out of Cutch in 1548, when a large army was sent against him jointly by Mughals and Sultan Beghda to aid Khengarji. He set out for Saurashtra with his retinue, loyalist and soldiers faithful to him and established Nawanagar. Thus throne of Cutch was left to Khengarji in 1548, who was its rightful heir.

Rao of Cutch
Khengarji I, thus expelling Jam Rawal, assumed the title of 1st Rao of Cutch in 1548 and was crowned at Rapar but in 1549 he shifted the capital to Bhuj. Khengarji I, is also noted as he founded the united Cutch State. He united Eastern Central & Western Cutch into one dominion, which before him was ruled partially by other Rajput tribes like Chawdas, Vaghelas, Chauhans, Kathis apart from the Jadejas. Upon integration of Cutch, in 1549, he shifted his capital to Bhuj, a city established by his father Rao Hamirji in 1510. Further, he expanded his territories beyond Cutch and conquered the territories of Santalpur and Chadchat near Palanpur  and estate of Pandu Mehvas, which took away from Sarkhaji, the son of Lunaji Vaghela.

Administration
He established Bhayyat system, thus integrating his clan and to accept him as their ruler. He gathered under him twelve Jadeja noble landowning families, who were related to him, as well as two noble families of the Waghela Rajput community. Bhayyat is the term used for all the descendants of the royal family who own and control their own domains allocated to them within the state and adhere to the feudal system.

He established the port of Mandvi in 1580.

Death
He died at Bhuj in 1585, having had issue, including two sons - Bharmalji I and Bhojrajji Khengarji of whom Bharmalji, the elder succeeded him to throne of Cutch. Bhojaraji became a Bhayyat and was given fiefdom of Kera, Kutch after his death.

References 

Maharajas of Kutch
1496 births
1585 deaths